Stiles White is an American special effects artist, television writer, television producer, screenwriter, film producer, and film director. He is best known for writing the film; "Knowing" and writing and directing the film; "Ouija". He is also known for co-writing screenplays with his wife, Juliet Snowden.

Career 
White began his career as a production assistant for Stan Winston Studios, working on projects ranging from Interview with the Vampire to Galaxy Quest. In 2004, he co-created the short-lived animated television series "Da Boom Crew". White made his screenwriting debut co-writing the 2005 horror film Boogeyman with his future spouse, Juliet Snowden. In 2014, White made his directing debut with the supernatural horror film Ouija, based on the Hasbro's board game of same name whose script he once again co-wrote with Snowden. The film was released on October 24, 2014 by Universal Pictures, grossing more than $102 million with a budget of just $5 million.

Future projects 
In June 2015, White and Snowden were hired by Universal to rewrite the untitled Bermuda Triangle film based on the original script by Alfred Gough and Miles Millar.

Personal life 
White is married to writer-producer Juliet Snowden.

Filmography

References

External links 
 

Living people
21st-century American screenwriters
People from Yuba City, California
American male screenwriters
Year of birth missing (living people)
Film directors from California
Screenwriters from California
Special effects people
21st-century American male writers